Radio Herceg-Bosne is a public radio station, broadcasting from city of Mostar.

Radio Herceg-Bosne began broadcasting on 1 May 1993 and it was formatted as Variety radio station with music, news and talk shows in Croatian.

Frequencies
The program is currently broadcast on 10 frequencies:

 Mostar 
 Herzegovina and Dalmatia  
 Sarajevo and central Bosnia 
 Posavina and Slavonia 
 Neum 
 Gornji Vakuf-Uskoplje 
 Stolac 
 Konjic and Jablanica 
 Prozor-Rama and Konjic 
 Jajce

See also 
List of radio stations in Bosnia and Herzegovina
RTVHB
Federalni Radio

References

External links 
 
 Communications Regulatory Agency of Bosnia and Herzegovina

Mostar
Radiotelevizija Herceg-Bosne
Radio stations established in 1993
Croatian Republic of Herzeg-Bosnia
Mass media in Mostar